Zaļesje Parish is an administrative unit of Ludza Municipality, its administrative center being the village of Zaļesje.

The place is close to the border with Russia, and  the name of the village is a common Russian toponym meaning "place over the woods".

By the 2009 administrative reform, this territorial unit was merged into the Zilupe Municipality. Since 1 July 2021, Zaļesje Parish has been part of Ludza Municipality.

References

Ludza Municipality
Parishes of Latvia
Latgale